Kingdom 5KR (originally named Nabila) is an 85.65-metre (281 ft) superyacht built for Saudi billionaire Adnan Khashoggi that is now owned by Saudi business magnate Al-Waleed bin Talal.

Overview 
The yacht was built in 1980 by the yacht builder Benetti at a cost of $100 million (equivalent to $ million in ). Its original interior was designed by Luigi Sturchio.

She was originally built as Nabila for Saudi billionaire Adnan Khashoggi (named for his daughter). During Khashoggi's ownership it was one of the largest yachts in the world, but as of July 2020, according to Wikipedia list of largest motor yachts, is ranked 96th and continues to fall down the rankings, due to the trend of larger yachts being built.

During her days as Nabila, she was featured in the James Bond movie Never Say Never Again, in which she was seen as Flying Saucer (translated from Italian Disco Volante in the source novel, Thunderball), the villain's superyacht mobile headquarters. She was also the inspiration for the song "Khashoggi's Ship" on The Miracle, the 1989 album by rock band Queen. 

After Khashoggi ran into financial problems, he sold the yacht in 1988 to the Sultan of Brunei, who in turn sold her to Donald Trump for $29 million. After a refit, Trump renamed her Trump Princess. To dock Trump Princess at the Atlantic City harbor, Trump obtained special dredging permits which instead of taking three years were accomplished in only a couple of months with support from Roger Stone and the lobbying firm Black, Manafort, Stone and Kelly.

Then she was sold in 1991 for $20 million to Prince Al-Waleed bin Talal who renamed the yacht Kingdom 5KR. The yacht's latest name stems from the Prince's investment company, Kingdom Holding Company, his lucky number (5), and his children's initials ("K" and "R").

When she was delivered she had five decks, a disco, a cinema with seats for 12, 11 opulent suites, a helipad on top (its funnels are sloped outward to avoid interference with the helicopters), a pool with a water jet on top in front of the heliport, 2 Riva tenders, a crew of 48, a top speed of 20 knots, and cruising speed of 17.5 knots; propulsion was supplied by two  NOHAB Polar engines.

See also 
 List of motor yachts by length

References

External links 
 

Business career of Donald Trump
Individual yachts
Motor yachts